Birds may refer to
Birds (MDPI journal), established in 2020.
Birds (Royal Society for the Protection of Birds journal), established in 1966.